Momisis nicobarica is a species of beetle in the family Cerambycidae. It was described by Gardner in 1936. It is known from the Nicobar Islands.

References

Astathini
Beetles described in 1936